Franz Kneissl (29 July 1921 – 24 May 1994) was an Austrian bobsledder who competed during the 1950s. He competed at the 1952 Winter Olympics in Oslo in the four-man event, but did not finish.

References
1952 bobsleigh four-man results
Bobsleigh four-man results: 1948-64.
Franz Kneissl's biography at Munzinger.de 

Austrian male bobsledders
Bobsledders at the 1952 Winter Olympics
1921 births
1994 deaths